Arkham Asylum: A Serious House on Serious Earth (often shortened to Batman: Arkham Asylum) is a Batman graphic novel written by Grant Morrison and illustrated by Dave McKean. The story follows the vigilante Batman, who is called upon to quell a maddening riot taking place in the infamous Arkham Asylum, a psychiatric hospital housing the most dangerous supervillains in Gotham City. Inside, Batman confronts many of his enduring rogues gallery, such as the Joker, Two-Face, and Killer Croc. As Batman ventures deeper, he discovers the origin of how the asylum was established, the history of its founder Amadeus Arkham, and the supernatural and psychological mystery that has been haunting the mansion.

Upon its release, the graphic novel garnered commercial and wide critical acclaim and is considered by many to be one of the greatest Batman stories of all time, and one of the best works in Grant Morrison's career. Morrison's narrative and Dave McKean's artistic style were described as more mature, unique, psychologically-driven and horror-oriented take on the Batman mythos and the distinctiveness from other conventional superhero works. The graphic novel would later become the definitive story of Arkham Asylum, a critical part of the Batman mythos. The critically acclaimed, similarly titled video game Batman: Arkham Asylum, the first game in the Batman: Arkham series, was partially influenced by the graphic novel.

Plot
On April 1st, Commissioner Gordon informs Batman that the patients of Arkham Asylum, led by the Joker, have taken over the facility, threatening to murder the staff unless Batman agrees to meet with them. Among the hostages are Dr. Charles Cavendish, Arkham's administrator, and Dr. Ruth Adams, a therapist. At the asylum, Batman discovers that Two-Face's mental condition has deteriorated as a result of Adams' therapy; she replaced Two-Face's trademark coin with a six-sided die, then a tarot deck, increasing the number of choices he has in the hope that he will eventually not leave any of his choices up to chance. Instead, the treatment renders him incapable of making even the simplest decisions, such as going to the bathroom.

The Joker forces Batman into a game of hide and seek, giving him one hour to escape Arkham before his adversaries are sent to hunt him down. Through the asylum, Batman encounters Clayface, Doctor Destiny, Scarecrow, Mad Hatter, Maxie Zeus, and Killer Croc. He reaches a secret room in the towers, where he finds Cavendish holding Adams hostage. It is revealed that Cavendish orchestrated the riots, and has Batman read the diary of the asylum's founder, Amadeus Arkham, when questioned why. 

In flashbacks, it is shown that Arkham's mentally ill mother, Elizabeth, suffered delusions of being tormented by a supernatural entity. After believing to have seen the creature himself (a bat), Arkham killed her to end her suffering. He blocked out the memory, only to have it return after an inmate, Martin "Mad Dog" Hawkins, raped and murdered Arkham's wife and daughter. Traumatized, Arkham vowed to bind the evil spirit of "The Bat" with sorcery. He killed Hawkins during a shock therapy session and continued his mission even after he was incarcerated in his own asylum, up until his death.

Cavendish came to believe that he was destined to continue Arkham's work. On April Fools' Day (the date Arkham's family was murdered), Cavendish released the patients and lured Batman to the asylum, believing him to be the bat Arkham spoke of. He accuses Batman of feeding the evil of the asylum by bringing it more insane souls and they fight, which ends when Adams slashes Cavendish's throat to save Batman.

Batman breaks down the front door of the asylum, proclaiming that the inmates are now free. He returns Two-Face's coin to him, stating that it should be up to him to decide his fate at the hands of the inmates. Two-Face declares that they will kill Batman if the coin lands scratched side up and let him go if the unscarred side lands. He flips the coin and declares Batman free. As the Joker bids Batman goodbye and the police arrives to retake the asylum, Two-Face looks at the coin and it is revealed that it actually landed scratched side up, implying he decided to ignore it. He turns to the stack of tarot cards and knocks them over, reciting a passage from Alice's Adventures in Wonderland: "Who cares for you? You're nothing but a pack of cards".

Conception and influences

The graphic novel was Grant Morrison's first work on Batman, and they would later note that the story was intended to be the start of their own version in the Batman saga. The subtitle A Serious House on Serious Earth is taken from the last stanza of Philip Larkin's poem Line 55, "Church Going", which reads: 

"A serious house on serious earth it is,
In whose blent air all our compulsions meet,
Are recognised, and robed as destinies.
And that much never can be obsolete,
Since someone will forever be surprising
A hunger in himself to be more serious,
And gravitating with it to this ground,
Which, he once heard, was proper to grow wise in,
If only that so many dead lie round".

The annotated script is a bonus material printed on every Arkham Asylum graphic novel ever since the 15th anniversary edition (2004), containing Morrison's full script that breaks down and explains much of the symbolic references in the story. The introduction page details the genesis behind Morrison's work coming to fruition:

Morrison and their fellow friend, Jim Clements, were fascinated by Len Wein's short and evocative paragraphs written on the history of Arkham Asylum in the Who's Who series during the development of the story. After the research, Morrison decided to use the tragedy of Amadeus Arkham as part of the story they wanted to tell. The thrill of the Arkham Asylum narrative was influenced by Frank Miller's The Dark Knight Returns and Alan Moore's Watchmen, inspiring Morrison, who wanted to make their own take on Batman in comics since they liked the authors' storytelling abilities and freedom to push the boundaries of comics to a greater degree.

Themes and style
The setting of Arkham Asylum plays a large role in how the inmates perceive their own insanity. As said by the Mad Hatter in the story: "Sometimes I think the asylum is the head. We're inside a huge head that dreams us all into being". He also described the asylum as being a "looking glass" that shows the subject their own twisted psyche.

Morrison conceived the graphic novel's storytelling technique to stay away from the original hardboiled pulp influence of Batman and those seen in American cinema adaptations. Style from European cinema, symbolism, and psychological horror themes were used to depict how insanity works within the setting of the asylum, referencing Lewis Carroll, Carl Jung, and Aleister Crowley. Hypostasis was used to push the story forward with psychoanalytic theory and Jungian archetypes were influences. 

The psychological themes of the Batman villains were deconstructed from their usual style seen in other comics.  Examples include Maxie Zeus, an electrified, emaciated figure with messianic delusions, and obsessed with electric shocks and coprophagia; Clayface is rapidly wasted from lack of feeding and is described as a "AIDS with two legs"; the Mad Hatter, whose obsession with Alice in Wonderland has pedophilic overtones and is a child molester; Killer Croc was originally drawn as suffering deformities similar to those of Joseph Merrick, the "Elephant Man", although his final incarnation is that of a humanoid crocodile; both Amadeus Arkham and Charles Cavendish are seen cross dressing. The Joker's mental condition is described as "super sanity"; he re-invents himself every day to suit his circumstances. He may be a harmless prankster one moment and a homicidal maniac the next. Joker is portrayed with a somewhat homosexual element, described as being indirectly "in love" with Batman. In the annotated script, Morrison initially wanted the Joker to "wear make-up and black lingerie in parody of Madonna". DC's editors, however, removed this, believing that readers might assume that Jack Nicholson's portrayal of the character in the Batman film would be portrayed as a transvestite.

Batman in this graphic novel is described as '80s interpretation of the character's violent, driven, and borderline psychopathic when he is driven close to the breaking point as he ventures the entire asylum in the story. Despite the horror-oriented themes, Morrison clarified that the symbolic concept is only for this book alone, and that their future Batman projects would not have the same form of tone.

Artwork

Dave McKean drew the principal art and the cover art of the Arkham Asylum graphic novel with Morrison supplying their own thumbnail layouts to the artist as guide of how the author wanted the panels in each page to function coherently. In illustrating the story, McKean chose to blend paintings, drawings, photography, and mixed-media collage to come up with striking page designs, and dense symbols. The artist used symbolism, imagery, and surrealism, and many scenes involve the use of symbols to denote a particular psychological device. For example, a Greek inscription can be seen scratched on the doorway of Maxie Zeus's electroshock chamber, which translates into "Discover thyself"; much of the symbolism was later explained and expanded in the annotated script.

Gaspar Saladino utilized distinctive lettering to give characters their own fonts and respective speech bubbles: Batman's is black with white lettering, Maxie gets blue with a Greek font, while Joker's speech is without a bubble at all; the red, ink-spattered script used for his dialogue is as ungovernable as the character himself. The practice of giving characters customized lettering treatments has since become widespread, especially in DC's Vertigo line and many Marvel comics.

Morrison estimated the final product's total page numbers would have been 64 pages. With McKean on board as the artist, the script was subsequently revised and the total page numbers were expanded to 120 pages.

Collected editions
Arkham Asylum was published in hardcover and trade paperback in 1989, the same year of Tim Burton's Batman film being released. Both Warner Books and Titan Books also published trade paperbacks in 1990.

The 15th anniversary edition was published in hardcover and trade paperback in 2004. This edition contains a brief biography of both Morrison and McKean, credits to those who involved in producing the first edition of the graphic novel, the annotated script, Morrison's personal thumbnail layouts, and an afterword by editor Karen Berger as bonus materials.

The 25th anniversary edition was published in hardcover and trade paperback in 2014. New bonus materials are Morrison's 2 page synopsis, some extras in the Morrison's thumbnail layouts, and a gallery of McKean's rough sketches and original promotion art back in the 90s.

The absolute edition was published in 2019 with McKean involved in designing the book. For this edition, McKean took the opportunity to change the colour of Joker's dialogues in the entire story from red and white back to wine red because this was what he always wanted back in the days, but somehow the design was changed in the post-production of the first edition. Majority of the bonus materials printed in the 15th and 25th anniversary editions are also presented in this book. New additions to this book are McKean's detailed description of how he designed this book and a few extras of the artist's rough sketches and promotion art. The trade paperback known as new edition was published in 2020 under the banner of DC Black Label.

The hardcover deluxe edition was published in 2021. This edition reuses the story pages from the absolute edition; the colour of Joker's dialogues in the entire story are all evidently changed into wine red. The design of the book and bonus material pages offered in this edition retain the same format as the 25th anniversary edition.

Critical reaction and legacy
Upon the graphic novel's release, it became a commercial success and catapulted Morrison and McKean's name in the comic book industry. Editor Karen Berger revealed that it has sold "close to a half million copies" by 2004, making it the best-selling original graphic novel in American superhero comics. According to the Grant Morrison website, the series has already sold over 600,000 copies worldwide.

Hilary Goldstein of IGN Comics praised the story and its "claustrophobic" portrayal of the asylum, saying that "Arkham Asylum is unlike any other Batman book you've ever read [and] one of the finest superhero books to ever grace a bookshelf". Goldstein also ranked Arkham Asylum #4 on a list of the 25 greatest Batman graphic novels, behind The Killing Joke, The Dark Knight Returns, and Year One. Rolling Stone praised the book as being one of Grant Morrison's best works, calling it "[their] first big commercial hit – and their first shot writing Batman, a character they would spend a great deal of time with over the course of their career – was this ground-breaking graphic novel featuring the grim, twisted artwork of painter Dave McKean. In this darkly poetic, psychologically rich tale, Batman faces off against the Joker, Two-Face, the Scarecrow and other villains inside Gotham City's house for the criminally insane". Joseph Szadkowski of The Washington Times called it as "one of the key sequential-art stories of the Batman library".

Keith Dooley of Comics Authority describes it as "psychologically and visually jarring book [that] brings the reader along with Amadeus Arkham and Batman on their journeys through their psyches in a world full of symbolism". Adding also that "Batman, his foes, and all of humanity are greatly affected by the power of symbolism, with this story laying before the reader that these fictional characters' stories are also, in many ways, our stories". Lucas Siegel from Newsarama also praised the comic, describing the art as "striking, beautiful, and yes, today's secret word: disturbing".

Morrison's response

Despite the critical acclaim of the first edition, Morrison was surprised to learn that the graphic novel's success was due to the readers were enjoying McKean's art more than the story. Negative criticisms were mainly aiming at the heavy reliance on symbolism which many found difficult to understand and accused the story didn't work well with the art together. Morrison did the best as possible to defend all the misunderstood meanings, claiming the real problem was McKean insisted on not wanting to adhere the original idea at all. The collaboration with the artist was retrospectively interpreted as "clashed and competed with the story's symbolic systems between the script and the art" when both actually envisioned the same story against each other. McKean wanted abstract rendering in his art which Morrison described as "doesn't have the most terrifying expressions of the real", wishing the panels were all in the same style as most comic book artists regularly illustrate. The author personally preferred Brian Bolland to have been the artist instead since Bolland's art in The Killing Joke was always the idea in mind when scripting the story.

The 15th anniversary edition reprinted the story which Morrison saw the opportunity of supplying the original script and adding annotations to reinforce every metaphors in the story. The annotated script revealed another conflicting factor between the two and that's McKean himself had personal inputs in the script's narrative structure. Some of the acts Morrison originally intended to include in the graphic novel were eventually excluded in the final product. One of the suggestions McKean made was removing Robin from the story as he thought mainly focusing the asylum's creepy interiors would be sufficient enough rather than adding unnecessary scenes that aren't taking place inside the mansion itself.

Morrison opined that everything in the graphic novel would have been more concrete if McKean hadn't interfere with the original idea and diminish it into a thin sense of plot. The author also recalled how the script was passed around to a number of professionals in the comics industry for review. Most of them thought the heavy symbolism and psychological horror elements were not only pretentious, but comical, and laughed at the idea. Morrison apocryphally cited a "Who's laughing now, @$$hole?" line in return when the original idea in the script actually does make much more sense than the current final product.

McKean's response

McKean, on the other hand, stated that it was appropriate for him to ignore some of the horror tone in Morrison's script when he called those acts were "absurd thing to do". The artist has said that he was "trying to make the book despite the subject, rather than because of it. At the end of the day, if you really love to do Batman comics, then that's probably the best thing to do. Not liking them, and then trying to make something out of them is just a waste of time". McKean even cited regular comic book illustration as "very, very overpainted, lavish illustrations in every panel just didn't work. It hampers the storytelling. It does everything wrong. It's very difficult to have any enthusiasm about it after that." in a way of expressing why he rejected the drawing technique since it's not his signature rendering.

Sequel
During the 2017 San Diego Comic-Con, Morrison said that a sequel to the Arkham Asylum graphic novel is in the works, tentatively titled Arkham Asylum 2. Comic book artist Chris Burnham, who collaborated with Morrison in Batman Incorporated, is attached to work on the project. Described as a Luc Besson-esque thriller, the sequel will take place in the future timeline Morrison created where Damian Wayne, Batman's son, has grown up to become an adult Batman of his own. While the graphic novel is described as a 120-page effort, further details or a release date have yet to be announced. In October 2020, Morrison stated that the sequel is currently on hold due to their involvement on the Brave New World television series, but said that 26 pages were already written and they expressed interest in resuming the work. Morrison also comments that the sequel will have a different vibe than the Arkham Asylum graphic novel, feeling more like a work of Philip K. Dick.

In other media
In the film Batman Begins (2005), Jonathan Crane's entrance to the Arkham Asylum's cellar with Rachel Dawes mirrors the Joker's own entrance with Batman in the novel. Heath Ledger's interpretation of the Joker in the 2008 sequel The Dark Knight was heavily influenced by Arkham Asylum: A Serious House on Serious Earth. Ledger was given a copy of the novel as a reference for preparation, which he "tried really hard to read and put it down".

During an interview with ToonZone in October 2015, Batman: Bad Blood director Jay Oliva expressed his interest in making an animated film adaptation of Arkham Asylum: A Serious House on Serious Earth, but Oliva departed from Warner Bros. Animation in 2017 before such adaptation could be made.

The game Batman: Arkham Asylum is loosely based on the comic, which follows a similar premise and also shares the same name. Although it was deemed an "ungamable graphic novel" by creative director Sefton Hill, its tone and psychological edge were a primary influence on the game. Additionally, the new warden of Arkham, Quincy Sharp, believes himself to be the reincarnation of Amadeus Arkham, and makes frequent reference to the history outlined in the comic, including Amadeus's mother's dementia, the murder of his wife and daughter by Martin Hawkins, and Amadeus' murder of Hawkins. Under this delusion, Sharp "haunts" the mansion and recreates several tableaux which appear in the comic, including the cell in which Amadeus inscribed his name into the floor.

References

Sources 
 Callahan, Timothy (2007) Grant Morrison: The Early Years. Masters of the Medium. Sequart Research & Literacy Organization. 
 Khouri, Andy. "Grant Morrison: The Early Years - Part II: Arkham Asylum", Comic Book Resources (July 6, 2007).
 Singer, Marc. (2011) Grant Morrison: Combining the Worlds of Contemporary Comics. University Press of Mississippi. .

External links
 15th Anniversary edition review at Comics Bulletin

American horror novels
Arkham Asylum
1989 graphic novels
1989 comics debuts
Comics based on Alice in Wonderland
Comics adapted into video games
Batman graphic novels
Comics by Grant Morrison
Horror graphic novels
Mental health in fiction
Medical novels
Psychiatric hospitals in fiction